The Boxer Rebellion, also known as the Boxer Uprising, the Boxer Insurrection, or the Yihetuan Movement, was an anti-foreign, anti-colonial, and anti-Christian uprising in China between 1899 and 1901, towards the end of the Qing dynasty, by the Society of Righteous and Harmonious Fists. The rebels were known as the "Boxers" in English because many of its members had practiced Chinese martial arts, which at the time were referred to as "Chinese boxing".

After the Sino-Japanese War of 1895, villagers in North China feared the expansion of foreign spheres of influence and resented the extension of privileges to Christian missionaries, who used them to shield their followers. In 1898 Northern China experienced several natural disasters, including the Yellow River flooding and droughts, which Boxers blamed on foreign and Christian influence. Beginning in 1899, Boxers spread violence across Shandong and the North China Plain, destroying foreign property such as railroads and attacking or murdering Christian missionaries and Chinese Christians. The events came to a head in June 1900 when Boxer fighters, convinced they were invulnerable to foreign weapons, converged on Beijing with the slogan "Support the Qing government and exterminate the foreigners." 

Diplomats, missionaries, soldiers and some Chinese Christians took refuge in the diplomatic Legation Quarter. An Eight Nation Alliance of American, Austro-Hungarian, British, French, German, Italian, Japanese and Russian troops moved into China to lift the siege and on 17 June stormed the Dagu Fort, at Tianjin. The Empress Dowager Cixi, who had initially been hesitant, now supported the Boxers and on 21 June, issued an Imperial Decree declaring war on the invading powers. Chinese officialdom was split between those supporting the Boxers and those favouring conciliation, led by Prince Qing. The supreme commander of the Chinese forces, the Manchu General Ronglu (Junglu), later claimed he acted to protect the foreigners. Officials in the southern provinces ignored the imperial order to fight against foreigners.

The Eight-Nation Alliance, after initially being turned back by the Imperial Chinese military and Boxer militia, brought 20,000 armed troops to China. They defeated the Imperial Army in Tianjin and arrived in Beijing on 14 August, relieving the fifty-five day siege of the Legations. Plunder of the capital and the surrounding countryside ensued, along with summary execution of those suspected of being Boxers in retribution. The Boxer Protocol of 7 September 1901, provided for the execution of government officials who had supported the Boxers, provisions for foreign troops to be stationed in Beijing, and 450 million taels of silver— more than the government's annual tax revenue—to be paid as indemnity over the course of the next 39 years to the eight nations involved. The Qing dynasty's handling of the Boxer Rebellion further weakened their control over China, and led the dynasty to attempt major governmental reforms in the aftermath.

Historical background

Origins of the Boxers 

The Righteous and Harmonious Fists (Yihequan) arose in the inland sections of the northern coastal province of Shandong, a region which had long been plagued by social unrest, religious sects, and martial societies. American Christian missionaries were probably the first people who referred to the well-trained, athletic young men as the "Boxers", because of the martial arts which they practised and the weapons training which they underwent. Their primary practice was a type of spiritual possession which involved the whirling of swords, violent prostrations, and the chanting of incantations to deities.

The opportunities to fight against Western encroachment and colonisation were especially attractive to unemployed village men, many of whom were teenagers. The tradition of possession and invulnerability went back several hundred years but took on special meaning against the powerful new weapons of the West. The Boxers, armed with rifles and swords, claimed supernatural invulnerability against cannons, rifle shots, and knife attacks. The Boxer groups popularly claimed that millions of soldiers would descend out of Heaven to assist them in purifying China of foreign oppression.

In 1895, despite ambivalence toward their heterodox practices, Yuxian, a Manchu who was then prefect of Caozhou and would later become provincial governor, cooperated with the Big Swords Society, whose original purpose was to fight bandits. The German Catholic missionaries of the Society of the Divine Word had built up their presence in the area, partially by taking in a significant portion of converts who were "in need of protection from the law". On one occasion in 1895, a large bandit gang defeated by the Big Swords Society claimed to be Catholics to avoid prosecution. "The line between Christians and bandits became increasingly indistinct", remarks Paul Cohen. 

Some missionaries such as George Stenz also used their privileges to intervene in lawsuits. The Big Swords responded by attacking Catholic properties and burning them. As a result of diplomatic pressure in the capital, Yuxian executed several Big Sword leaders, but did not punish anyone else. More martial secret societies started emerging after this.

The early years saw a variety of village activities, not a broad movement with a united purpose. Martial folk-religious societies such as the Baguadao (Eight Trigrams) prepared the way for the Boxers. Like the Red Boxing school or the Plum Flower Boxers, the Boxers of Shandong were more concerned with traditional social and moral values, such as filial piety, than with foreign influences. One leader, Zhu Hongdeng (Red Lantern Zhu), started as a wandering healer, specialising in skin ulcers, and gained wide respect by refusing payment for his treatments. Zhu claimed descent from Ming dynasty emperors, since his surname was the surname of the Ming imperial family. He announced that his goal was to "Revive the Qing and destroy the foreigners" ("扶清滅洋 fu Qing mie yang").

The enemy was seen as foreign influence. They decided the "primary devils" were the Christian missionaries whilst the "secondary devils" were the Chinese converts to Christianity, which both had either to repent, be driven out or killed.

Causes of the conflict and the unrest 
Escalating tensions caused Chinese to turn against "foreign devils" who scrambled for power in the late 19th century. The Western success at controlling China, growing anti-imperialist sentiment, and extreme weather conditions, sparked the movement. A drought followed by floods in Shandong province in 1897–1898 forced farmers to flee to cities and seek food.

A major cause of discontent in north China was missionary activity. The Treaty of Tientsin (Tianjin) and the Convention of Peking, signed in 1860 after the Second Opium War, had granted foreign missionaries the freedom to preach anywhere in China and to buy land on which to build churches. On 1 November 1897, a band of armed men who were perhaps members of the Big Swords Society stormed the residence of a German missionary from the Society of the Divine Word and killed two priests. This attack is known as the Juye Incident.
When Kaiser Wilhelm II received news of these murders, he dispatched the German East Asia Squadron to occupy Jiaozhou Bay on the southern coast of the Shandong peninsula. 

In December 1897, Wilhelm II declared his intent to seize territory in China, which triggered a "scramble for concessions" by which Britain, France, Russia and Japan also secured their own sphere of influence in China. Germany gained exclusive control of developmental loans, mining, and railway ownership in Shandong province. Russia gained influence of all territory north of the Great Wall, plus the previous tax exemption for trade in Mongolia and Xinjiang, economic powers similar to Germany's over Fengtian, Jilin and Heilongjiang provinces. France gained influence of Yunnan, most of Guangxi and Guangdong provinces, Japan over Fujian province. Britain gained influence of the whole Yangtze River Valley (defined as all provinces adjoining the Yangtze river as well as Henan and Zhejiang provinces), parts of Guangdong and Guangxi provinces and part of Tibet.

Only Italy's request for Zhejiang province was declined by the Chinese government. These do not include the lease and concession territories where the foreign powers had full authority. The Russian government militarily occupied their zone, imposed their law and schools, seized mining and logging privileges, settled their citizens, and even established their municipal administration on several cities.

In October 1898, a group of Boxers attacked the Christian community of Liyuantun village where a temple to the Jade Emperor had been converted into a Catholic church. Disputes had surrounded the church since 1869, when the temple had been granted to the Christian residents of the village. This incident marked the first time the Boxers used the slogan "Support the Qing, destroy the foreigners" ("扶清滅洋 fu Qing mie yang") that later characterised them. 

The "Boxers" called themselves the "Militia United in Righteousness" for the first time one year later, at the Battle of Senluo Temple (October 1899), a clash between Boxers and Qing government troops. By using the word "Militia" rather than "Boxers", they distanced themselves from forbidden martial arts sects, and tried to give their movement the legitimacy of a group that defended orthodoxy.

Aggression toward missionaries and Christians drew sharp responses from diplomats protecting their nationals. In 1899, the French minister in Beijing helped the missionaries to obtain an edict granting official status to every order in the Roman Catholic hierarchy, enabling local priests to support their people in legal or family disputes and bypass the local officials. After the German government took over Shandong, many Chinese feared that the foreign missionaries and possibly all Christian activities were imperialist attempts at "carving the melon", i.e., to colonise China piece by piece. A Chinese official expressed the animosity towards foreigners succinctly, "Take away your missionaries and your opium and you will be welcome."

The early growth of the Boxer movement coincided with the Hundred Days' Reform (11 June – 21 September 1898), in which progressive Chinese officials, with support from Protestant missionaries, persuaded the Guangxu Emperor to institute sweeping reforms. This alienated many conservative officials, whose opposition led Empress Dowager Cixi to intervene and reverse the reforms. The failure of the reform movement disillusioned many educated Chinese and thus further weakened the Qing government. The empress seized power and placed the reformist emperor under house arrest.

The national crisis was widely perceived as caused by "foreign aggression" inside. Even though afterwards a majority of Chinese were extremely grateful for the actions of the alliance. At the time, the Qing government was extremely corrupt, common people often faced extortions from government officials and the government offered no protection from the violent actions of the Boxers.

Boxer War

Intensifying crisis 

In January 1900, with a majority of conservatives in the imperial court, Empress Dowager Cixi changed her position on the Boxers, and issued edicts in their defence, causing protests from foreign powers. In spring 1900, the Boxer movement spread rapidly north from Shandong into the countryside near Beijing. Boxers burned Christian churches, killed Chinese Christians and intimidated Chinese officials who stood in their way. American Minister Edwin H. Conger cabled Washington, "the whole country is swarming with hungry, discontented, hopeless idlers."

On 30 May the diplomats, led by British Minister Claude Maxwell MacDonald, requested that foreign soldiers come to Beijing to defend the legations. The Chinese government reluctantly acquiesced, and the next day a multinational force of 435 navy troops from eight countries debarked from warships and travelled by train from Dagu (Taku) to Beijing. They set up defensive perimeters around their respective missions.

On 5 June 1900, the railway line to Tianjin was cut by Boxers in the countryside and Beijing was isolated. On 11 June, at Yongding gate, the secretary of the Japanese legation, Sugiyama Akira, was attacked and killed by the soldiers of General Dong Fuxiang, who were guarding the southern part of the Beijing walled city. Armed with Mauser rifles but wearing traditional uniforms, Dong's troops had threatened the foreign Legations in the fall of 1898 soon after arriving in Beijing, so much that United States Marines had been called to Beijing to guard the legations. The German Kaiser Wilhelm II was so alarmed by the Chinese Muslim troops that he requested the Caliph Abdul Hamid II of the Ottoman Empire to find a way to stop the Muslim troops from fighting.

The Caliph agreed to the Kaiser's request and sent Enver Pasha (not to be confused with the future Young Turk leader) to China in 1901, but the rebellion was over by that time.

On 11 June, the first Boxer was seen in the Legation Quarter. The German Minister, Clemens von Ketteler, and German soldiers captured a Boxer boy and inexplicably executed him. In response, thousands of Boxers burst into the walled city of Beijing that afternoon and burned many of the Christian churches and cathedrals in the city, burning some victims alive. American and British missionaries took refuge in the Methodist Mission and an attack there was repulsed by American Marines. The soldiers at the British Embassy and German Legations shot and killed several Boxers, alienating the Chinese population of the city and nudging the Qing government towards support of the Boxers.

The Muslim Gansu braves and Boxers, along with other Chinese, then attacked and killed Chinese Christians around the legations in revenge for foreign attacks on Chinese.

Seymour Expedition 

As the situation grew more violent, the Eight Powers authorities at Dagu dispatched a second multinational force to Beijing on 10 June 1900. This force of 2,000 sailors and marines was under the command of Vice-Admiral Edward Seymour RN, the largest contingent being British. The force moved by train from Dagu to Tianjin with the agreement of the Chinese government, but the railway had been severed between Tianjin and Beijing. Seymour resolved to continue forward by rail to the break and repair the railway, or progress on foot from there if necessary, as it was only 120 km from Tianjin to Beijing. When Seymour left Tianjin and started toward Beijing, it angered the imperial court.

The court then replaced Prince Qing at the Zongli Yamen, with Manchu Prince Duan, a member of the imperial Aisin Gioro clan (foreigners called him a "Blood Royal"), who was extremely anti-foreigner and pro-Boxer. He soon ordered the Imperial army to attack the foreign forces. Confused by conflicting orders from Beijing, General Nie Shicheng let Seymour's army pass by in their trains.

After leaving Tianjin, the force quickly reached Langfang, but the railway was destroyed there. Seymour's engineers tried to repair the line, but the force found itself surrounded, as the railway in both behind directions was destroyed. They were attacked from all sides by Chinese irregulars and Imperial troops. Five thousand of Dong Fuxiang's "Gansu Braves" and an unknown number of "Boxers" won a costly but major victory over Seymour's troops at the Battle of Langfang on 18 June. Seymour then retreated from Langfang. The force was constantly fired upon by cavalry, and artillery bombarded their positions. It was reported that the Chinese artillery was superior, since the force had not brought much artillery with them, thinking they could easily sweep through Chinese resistance.

The Seymour force could not locate the Chinese artillery, which was raining shells upon their positions. Chinese troops employed mining, engineering, flooding, and simultaneous attacks. The Chinese also employed pincer movements, ambushes, and sniping with some success against the foreigners.

On 18 June, Seymour learned of attacks on the Legation Quarter in Beijing, and decided to continue advancing, this time along the Beihe river, toward Tongzhou,  from Beijing. By 19 June, the force was halted by progressively stiffening resistance, and started to retreat southward along the river with over 200 wounded. They loaded all their wounded and remaining supplies on four commandeered junks, which they pulled along with ropes from the riverbanks. 

The force was now very low on food, ammunition, and medical supplies. They happened upon the Great Xigu Arsenal, a hidden Qing munitions cache of which the Eight Powers had had no knowledge until then. They immediately captured and occupied it, discovering Krupp field guns and rifles with millions of rounds of ammunition, along with millions of pounds of rice and ample medical supplies.

There they dug in and awaited rescue. A Chinese servant slipped through the Boxer and Imperial lines, reached Tianjin, and informed the Eight Powers of Seymour's predicament. His force was surrounded by Imperial troops and Boxers, attacked nearly around the clock, and at the point of being overrun. The Eight Powers sent a relief column from Tianjin of 1,800 men (900 Russian troops from Port Arthur, 500 British seamen, and other assorted troops). On 25 June the relief column reached Seymour. The Seymour force now destroyed the Arsenal: they spiked the captured field guns and set fire to any munitions that they could not take (an estimated £3 million worth). The Seymour force and the relief column marched back to Tientsin, unopposed, on 26 June. Seymour's casualties during the expedition were 62 killed and 228 wounded.

Conflicting attitudes within the Qing imperial court 

Meanwhile, in Beijing, on 16 June, Empress Dowager Cixi summoned the imperial court for a mass audience and addressed the choice between using the Boxers to evict the foreigners from the city and seeking a diplomatic solution. In response to a high official who doubted the efficacy of the Boxers, Cixi replied that both sides of the debate at the imperial court realised that popular support for the Boxers in the countryside was almost universal and that suppression would be both difficult and unpopular, especially when foreign troops were on the march.

Two factions were active during this debate. On one side were anti-foreigners who viewed foreigners as invasive and imperialistic and evoked a nativist populism. They advocated taking advantage of the Boxers to achieve the expulsion of foreign troops and foreign influences. The pro-foreigners on the other hand advanced rapprochement with foreign governments, seeing the Boxers as superstitious and ignorant.

The event that tilted the Qing imperial government irrevocably toward support of the Boxers and war with the foreign powers was the attack of foreign navies on the Dagu Forts near Tianjin, on 17 June 1900.

Siege of the Beijing legations 

On 15 June, Qing imperial forces deployed electric mines in the Beihe River (Peiho) to prevent the Eight-Nation Alliance from sending ships to attack.
With a difficult military situation in Tianjin and a total breakdown of communications between Tianjin and Beijing, the allied nations took steps to reinforce their military presence significantly. On 17 June they took the Dagu Forts commanding the approaches to Tianjin, and from there brought increasing numbers of troops on shore. When Cixi received an ultimatum that same day demanding that China surrender total control over all its military and financial affairs to foreigners, she defiantly stated before the entire Grand Council, "Now they [the Powers] have started the aggression, and the extinction of our nation is imminent. If we just fold our arms and yield to them, I would have no face to see our ancestors after death. If we must perish, why don't we fight to the death?"
It was at this point that Cixi began to blockade the legations with the armies of the Peking Field Force, which began the siege. Cixi stated that "I have always been of the opinion, that the allied armies had been permitted to escape too easily in 1860. Only a united effort was then necessary to have given China the victory. Today, at last, the opportunity for revenge has come", and said that millions of Chinese would join the cause of fighting the foreigners since the Manchus had provided "great benefits" on China.
On receipt of the news of the attack on the Dagu Forts on 19 June, Empress Dowager Cixi immediately sent an order to the legations that the diplomats and other foreigners depart Beijing under escort of the Chinese army within 24 hours.

The next morning, diplomats from the besieged legations met to discuss the Empress's offer. The majority quickly agreed that they could not trust the Chinese army. Fearing that they would be killed, they agreed to refuse the Empress's demand. The German Imperial Envoy, Baron Klemens Freiherr von Ketteler, was infuriated with the actions of the Chinese army troops and determined to take his complaints to the royal court. Against the advice of the fellow foreigners, the baron left the legations with a single aide and a team of porters to carry his sedan chair. On his way to the palace, von Ketteler was killed on the streets of Beijing by a Manchu captain. His aide managed to escape the attack and carried word of the baron's death back to the diplomatic compound. At this news, the other diplomats feared they also would be murdered if they left the legation quarter and they chose to continue to defy the Chinese order to depart Beijing. The legations were hurriedly fortified. Most of the foreign civilians, which included a large number of missionaries and businessmen, took refuge in the British legation, the largest of the diplomatic compounds. Chinese Christians were primarily housed in the adjacent palace (Fu) of Prince Su, who was forced to abandon his property by the foreign soldiers.

On 21 June, Empress Dowager Cixi declared war against all foreign powers. Regional governors in the south, who commanded substantial modernised armies, such as Li Hongzhang at Canton, Yuan Shikai in Shandong, Zhang Zhidong at Wuhan and Liu Kunyi at Nanjing, formed the Mutual Defense Pact of the Southeastern Provinces. They refused to recognise the imperial court's declaration of war, which they declared a luan-ming (illegitimate order) and withheld knowledge of it from the public in the south. Yuan Shikai used his own forces to suppress Boxers in Shandong, and Zhang entered into negotiations with the foreigners in Shanghai to keep his army out of the conflict. The neutrality of these provincial and regional governors left the majority of Chinese military forces out of the conflict.

The legations of the United Kingdom, France, Germany, Italy, Austria-Hungary, Spain, Belgium, the Netherlands, the United States, Russia and Japan were located in the Beijing Legation Quarter south of the Forbidden City. The Chinese army and Boxer irregulars besieged the Legation Quarter from 20 June to 14 August 1900. A total of 473 foreign civilians, 409 soldiers, marines and sailors from eight countries, and about 3,000 Chinese Christians took refuge there. Under the command of the British minister to China, Claude Maxwell MacDonald, the legation staff and military guards defended the compound with small arms, three machine guns, and one old muzzle-loaded cannon, which was nicknamed the International Gun because the barrel was British, the carriage Italian, the shells Russian and the crew American. Chinese Christians in the legations led the foreigners to the cannon and it proved important in the defence. Also under siege in Beijing was the Northern Cathedral (Beitang) of the Catholic Church. The Beitang was defended by 43 French and Italian soldiers, 33 Catholic foreign priests and nuns, and about 3,200 Chinese Catholics. The defenders suffered heavy casualties from lack of food and from mines which the Chinese exploded in tunnels dug beneath the compound. The number of Chinese soldiers and Boxers besieging the Legation Quarter and the Beitang is unknown. 
Manchu Prince Zaiyi's Manchu bannermen in the Tiger and Divine Corps led attacks against the Catholic cathedral church. Manchu official Qixiu 啟秀 also led attacks against the cathedral.

On 22 and 23 June, Chinese soldiers and Boxers set fire to areas north and west of the British Legation, using it as a "frightening tactic" to attack the defenders. The nearby Hanlin Academy, a complex of courtyards and buildings that housed "the quintessence of Chinese scholarship ... the oldest and richest library in the world", caught fire. Each side blamed the other for the destruction of the invaluable books it contained.

After the failure to burn out the foreigners, the Chinese army adopted an anaconda-like strategy. The Chinese built barricades surrounding the Legation Quarter and advanced, brick by brick, on the foreign lines, forcing the foreign legation guards to retreat a few feet at a time. This tactic was especially used in the Fu, defended by Japanese and Italian sailors and soldiers, and inhabited by most of the Chinese Christians. Fusillades of bullets, artillery and firecrackers were directed against the Legations almost every night—but did little damage. Sniper fire took its toll among the foreign defenders. Despite their numerical advantage, the Chinese did not attempt a direct assault on the Legation Quarter although in the words of one of the besieged, "it would have been easy by a strong, swift movement on the part of the numerous Chinese troops to have annihilated the whole body of foreigners ... in an hour." American missionary Frank Gamewell and his crew of "fighting parsons" fortified the Legation Quarter, but impressed Chinese Christians to do most of the physical labour of building defences.

The Germans and the Americans occupied perhaps the most crucial of all defensive positions: the Tartar Wall. The Chinese advanced toward both positions by building barricades even closer. "The men all feel they are in a trap", said the American commander, Capt. John T. Myers, "and simply await the hour of execution." On 30 June, the Chinese forced the Germans off the Wall, leaving the American Marines alone in its defence. In June 1900, one American described the scene of 20,000 Boxers storming the walls:

At the same time, a Chinese barricade was advanced to within a few feet of the American positions and it became clear that the Americans had to abandon the wall or force the Chinese to retreat. At 2 am on 3 July, 56 British, Russian and American marines and sailors, under the command of Myers, launched an assault against the Chinese barricade on the wall. The attack caught the Chinese sleeping, killed about 20 of them, and expelled the rest of them from the barricades. The Chinese did not attempt to advance their positions on the Tartar Wall for the remainder of the siege.

Sir Claude MacDonald said 13 July was the "most harassing day" of the siege. The Japanese and Italians in the Fu were driven back to their last defence line. The Chinese detonated a mine beneath the French Legation pushing the French and Austrians out of most of the French Legation. On 16 July, the most capable British officer was killed and the journalist George Ernest Morrison was wounded. But American Minister Edwin Hurd Conger established contact with the Chinese government and on 17 July, an armistice was declared by the Chinese. More than 40% of the legation guards were dead or wounded. The motivation of the Chinese was probably the realisation that an allied force of 20,000 men had landed in China and retribution for the siege was at hand.

Officials and commanders at cross purposes 

The Manchu General Ronglu concluded that it was futile to fight all of the powers simultaneously and declined to press home the siege. The Manchu Zaiyi (Prince Duan), an anti-foreign friend of Dong Fuxiang, wanted artillery for Dong's troops to destroy the legations. Ronglu blocked the transfer of artillery to Zaiyi and Dong, preventing them from attacking. Ronglu forced Dong Fuxiang and his troops to pull back from completing the siege and destroying the legations, thereby saving the foreigners and making diplomatic concessions. Ronglu and Prince Qing sent food to the legations, and used their Manchu Bannermen to attack the Muslim Gansu Braves ("Kansu Braves" in the spelling of the time) of Dong Fuxiang and the Boxers who were besieging the foreigners. They issued edicts ordering the foreigners to be protected, but the Gansu warriors ignored it, and fought against Bannermen who tried to force them away from the legations. The Boxers also took commands from Dong Fuxiang. Ronglu also deliberately hid an Imperial Decree from General Nie Shicheng. The Decree ordered him to stop fighting the Boxers because of the foreign invasion, and also because the population was suffering. Due to Ronglu's actions, General Nie continued to fight the Boxers and killed many of them even as the foreign troops were making their way into China. Ronglu also ordered Nie to protect foreigners and save the railway from the Boxers. Because parts of the Railway were saved under Ronglu's orders, the foreign invasion army was able to transport itself into China quickly. General Nie committed thousands of troops against the Boxers instead of against the foreigners. Nie was already outnumbered by the Allies by 4,000 men. General Nie was blamed for attacking the Boxers, as Ronglu let Nie take all the blame. At the Battle of Tianjin (Tientsin), General Nie decided to sacrifice his life by walking into the range of Allied guns.

Xu Jingcheng, who had served as the Qing Envoy to many of the same states under siege in the Legation Quarter, argued that "the evasion of extraterritorial rights and the killing of foreign diplomats are unprecedented in China and abroad." Xu and five other officials urged Empress Dowager Cixi to order the repression of Boxers, the execution of their leaders, and a diplomatic settlement with foreign armies. The Empress Dowager, outraged, sentenced Xu and the five others to death for "willfully and absurdly petitioning the Imperial Court" and "building subversive thought." They were executed on 28 July 1900 and their severed heads placed on display at Caishikou Execution Grounds in Beijing.

Reflecting this vacillation, some Chinese soldiers were quite liberally firing at foreigners under siege from its very onset. Cixi did not personally order imperial troops to conduct a siege, and on the contrary had ordered them to protect the foreigners in the legations. Prince Duan led the Boxers to loot his enemies within the imperial court and the foreigners, although imperial authorities expelled Boxers after they were let into the city and went on a looting rampage against both the foreign and the Qing imperial forces. Older Boxers were sent outside Beijing to halt the approaching foreign armies, while younger men were absorbed into the Muslim Gansu army.

With conflicting allegiances and priorities motivating the various forces inside Beijing, the situation in the city became increasingly confused. The foreign legations continued to be surrounded by both Qing imperial and Gansu forces. While Dong Fuxiang's Gansu army, now swollen by the addition of the Boxers, wished to press the siege, Ronglu's imperial forces seem to have largely attempted to follow Empress Dowager Cixi's decree and protect the legations. However, to satisfy the conservatives in the imperial court, Ronglu's men also fired on the legations and let off firecrackers to give the impression that they, too, were attacking the foreigners. Inside the legations and out of communication with the outside world, the foreigners simply fired on any targets that presented themselves, including messengers from the imperial court, civilians and besiegers of all persuasions. Dong Fuxiang was denied artillery held by Ronglu which stopped him from levelling the legations, and when he complained to Empress Dowager Cixi on 23 June, she dismissively said that "Your tail is becoming too heavy to wag." The Alliance discovered large amounts of unused Chinese Krupp artillery and shells after the siege was lifted.

The armistice, although occasionally broken, endured until 13 August when, with an allied army led by the British Alfred Gaselee approaching Beijing to relieve the siege, the Chinese launched their heaviest fusillade on the Legation Quarter. As the foreign army approached, Chinese forces melted away.

Gaselee Expedition 

Foreign navies started building up their presence along the northern China coast from the end of April 1900. Several international forces were sent to the capital, with varying success, and the Chinese forces were ultimately defeated by the Eight-Nation Alliance of Austria-Hungary, France, Germany, Italy, Japan, Russia, the United Kingdom and the United States. Independent of the alliance, the Netherlands dispatched three cruisers in July to protect its citizens in Shanghai.

British Lieutenant-General Alfred Gaselee acted as the commanding officer of the Eight-Nation Alliance, which eventually numbered 55,000. The main contingent was composed of Japanese (20,840), Russian (13,150), British (12,020), French (3,520), U.S. (3,420), German (900), Italian (80), Austro-Hungarian (75) and anti-Boxer Chinese troops. The "First Chinese Regiment" (Weihaiwei Regiment) which was praised for its performance, consisted of Chinese collaborators serving in the British military. Notable events included the seizure of the Dagu Forts commanding the approaches to Tianjin and the boarding and capture of four Chinese destroyers by British Commander Roger Keyes. Among the foreigners besieged in Tianjin was a young American mining engineer named Herbert Hoover, who would go on to become the 31st President of the United States.

The international force finally captured Tianjin on 14 July. The international force suffered its heaviest casualties of the Boxer Rebellion in the Battle of Tianjin. With Tianjin as a base, the international force marched from Tianjin to Beijing, about 120 km, with 20,000 allied troops. On 4 August, there were approximately 70,000 Qing imperial troops and anywhere from 50,000 to 100,000 Boxers along the way. The allies only encountered minor resistance, fighting battles at Beicang and Yangcun. At Yangcun, the 14th Infantry Regiment of the U.S. and British troops led the assault. The weather was a major obstacle. Conditions were extremely humid with temperatures sometimes reaching . These high temperatures and insects plagued the Allies. Soldiers became dehydrated and horses died. Chinese villagers killed Allied troops who searched for wells.

The heat killed Allied soldiers, who foamed at the mouth. The tactics along the way were gruesome on either side. Allied soldiers beheaded already dead Chinese corpses, bayoneted or beheaded live Chinese civilians, and raped Chinese girls and women. Cossacks were reported to have killed Chinese civilians almost automatically and Japanese kicked a Chinese soldier to death. The Chinese responded to the Alliance's atrocities with similar acts of violence and cruelty, especially towards captured Russians. Lieutenant Smedley Butler saw the remains of two Japanese soldiers nailed to a wall, who had their tongues cut off and their eyes gouged. Lieutenant Butler was wounded during the expedition in the leg and chest, later receiving the Brevet Medal in recognition for his actions.

The international force reached Beijing on 14 August. Following the defeat of Beiyang army in the First Sino-Japanese War, the Chinese government had invested heavily in modernising the imperial army, which was equipped with modern Mauser repeater rifles and Krupp artillery. Three modernised divisions consisting of Manchu Bannermen protected the Beijing Metropolitan region. Two of them were under the command of the anti-Boxer Prince Qing and Ronglu, while the anti-foreign Prince Duan commanded the ten-thousand-strong Hushenying, or "Tiger Spirit Division", which had joined the Gansu Braves and Boxers in attacking the foreigners. It was a Hushenying captain who had assassinated the German diplomat Ketteler. The Tenacious Army under Nie Shicheng received Western style training under German and Russian officers in addition to their modernised weapons and uniforms. They effectively resisted the Alliance at the Battle of Tientsin before retreating and astounded the Alliance forces with the accuracy of their artillery during the siege of the Tianjin concessions (the artillery shells failed to explode upon impact due to corrupt manufacturing). The Gansu Braves under Dong Fuxiang, which some sources described as "ill disciplined", were armed with modern weapons but were not trained according to Western drill and wore traditional Chinese uniforms. They led the defeat of the Alliance at Langfang in the Seymour Expedition and were the most ferocious in besieging the Legations in Beijing. Some Banner forces were given modernised weapons and Western training, becoming the Metropolitan Banner forces, which were decimated in the fighting. Among the Manchu dead was the father of the writer Lao She.

The British won the race among the international forces to be the first to reach the besieged Legation Quarter. The U.S. was able to play a role due to the presence of U.S. ships and troops stationed in Manila since the U.S. conquest of the Philippines during the Spanish–American War and the subsequent Philippine–American War. In the U.S. military, the action in the Boxer Rebellion was known as the China Relief Expedition. United States Marines scaling the walls of Beijing is an iconic image of the Boxer Rebellion.

The British Army reached the legation quarter on the afternoon of 14 August and relieved the Legation Quarter. The Beitang was relieved on 16 August, first by Japanese soldiers and then, officially, by the French.

Evacuation of the Qing imperial court from Beijing to Xi'an 

In the early hours of 15 August, just as the Foreign Legations were being relieved, Empress Dowager Cixi, dressed in the padded blue cotton of a farm woman, the Guangxu Emperor, and a small retinue climbed into three wooden ox carts and escaped from the city covered with rough blankets. Legend has it that the Empress Dowager then either ordered that the Guangxu Emperor's favourite concubine, Consort Zhen, be thrown down a well in the Forbidden City or tricked her into drowning herself. The journey was made all the more arduous by the lack of preparation, but the Empress Dowager insisted this was not a retreat, rather a "tour of inspection." After weeks of travel, the party arrived in Xi'an in Shaanxi province, beyond protective mountain passes where the foreigners could not reach, deep in Chinese Muslim territory and protected by the Gansu Braves. The foreigners had no orders to pursue the Empress Dowager, so they decided to stay put.

Russian invasion of Manchuria 

The Russian Empire and the Qing Dynasty had maintained a long peace, starting with the Treaty of Nerchinsk in 1689, but Russian forces took advantage of Chinese defeats to impose the Aigun Treaty of 1858 and the Treaty of Peking of 1860 which ceded formerly Chinese territory in Manchuria to Russia, much of which is held by Russia to the present day (Primorye). The Russians aimed for control over the Amur River for navigation, and the all-weather ports of Dairen and Port Arthur in the Liaodong peninsula. The rise of Japan as an Asian power provoked Russia's anxiety, especially in light of expanding Japanese influence in Korea. Following Japan's victory in the First Sino-Japanese War of 1895, the Triple Intervention of Russia, Germany and France forced Japan to return the territory won in Liaodong, leading to a de facto Sino-Russian alliance.

Local Chinese in Manchuria were incensed at these Russian advances and began to harass Russians and Russian institutions, such as the Chinese Eastern Railway. In June 1900, the Chinese bombarded the town of Blagoveshchensk on the Russian side of the Amur. The Czar's government used the pretext of Boxer activity to move some 200,000 troops into the area to crush the Boxers. The Chinese used arson to destroy a bridge carrying a railway and a barracks on 27 July. The Boxers destroyed railways and cut lines for telegraphs and burned the Yantai mines.

By 21 September, Russian troops took Jilin and Liaodong, and by the end of the month completely occupied Manchuria, where their presence was a major factor leading to the Russo-Japanese War.

The Chinese Honghuzi bandits of Manchuria, who had fought alongside the Boxers in the war, did not stop when the Boxer rebellion was over, and continued guerrilla warfare against the Russian occupation up to the Russo-Japanese war when the Russians were defeated by Japan.

Massacre of missionaries and Chinese Christians 

Orthodox, Protestant, and Catholic missionaries and their Chinese parishioners were massacred throughout northern China, some by Boxers and others by government troops and authorities. After the declaration of war on Western powers in June 1900, Yuxian, who had been named governor of Shanxi in March of that year, implemented a brutal anti-foreign and anti-Christian policy. On 9 July, reports circulated that he had executed forty-four foreigners (including women and children) from missionary families whom he had invited to the provincial capital Taiyuan under the promise to protect them. Although the purported eyewitness accounts have recently been questioned as improbable, this event became a notorious symbol of Chinese anger, known as the Taiyuan Massacre. The Baptist Missionary Society, based in England, opened its mission in Shanxi in 1877. In 1900 all its missionaries there were killed, along with all 120 converts. By the summer's end, more foreigners and as many as 2,000 Chinese Christians had been put to death in the province. Journalist and historical writer Nat Brandt has called the massacre of Christians in Shanxi "the greatest single tragedy in the history of Christian evangelicalism."

During the Boxer Rebellion as a whole, a total of 136 Protestant missionaries and 53 children were killed, and 47 Catholic priests and nuns, 30,000 Chinese Catholics, 2,000 Chinese Protestants, and 200 to 400 of the 700 Russian Orthodox Christians in Beijing were estimated to have been killed. Collectively, the Protestant dead were called the China Martyrs of 1900. 222 of Russian Christian Chinese Martyrs including St. Metrophanes were locally canonised as New Martyrs on 22 April 1902, after Archimandrite Innocent (Fugurovsky), head of the Russian Orthodox Mission in China, solicited the Most Holy Synod to perpetuate their memory. This was the first local canonisation for more than two centuries. The Boxers went on to murder Christians across 26 prefectures.

Aftermath

Occupation, looting, and atrocities 

The Eight Nation Alliance occupied Zhili province while Russia occupied Manchuria, but the rest of China was not occupied due to the actions of several Han governors who formed the Mutual Protection of Southeast China that refused to obey the declaration of war and kept their armies and provinces out of the war. Zhang Zhidong told Everard Fraser, the Hankou-based British consul general, that he despised Manchus in order that the Eight Nation Alliance would not occupy provinces under the Mutual Defense Pact.

Beijing, Tianjin and Zhili province were occupied for more than one year by the international expeditionary force under the command of German General Alfred Graf von Waldersee. The Americans and British paid General Yuan Shikai and his army (the Right Division) to help the Eight Nation Alliance suppress the Boxers. Yuan Shikai's forces killed tens of thousands of people in their anti-Boxer campaign in Zhili Province and Shandong after the Alliance captured Beijing. The majority of the hundreds of thousands of people living in inner Beijing during the Qing were Manchus and Mongol bannermen from the Eight Banners after they were moved there in 1644, when Han Chinese were expelled. Sawara Tokusuke, a Japanese journalist, wrote in  "Miscellaneous Notes about the Boxers" about the rapes of Manchu and Mongol banner girls. A daughter and wife of Mongol banner noble Chongqi 崇绮 of the Alute clan were allegedly gang raped. Other relatives, including his son, Baochu, killed themselves after he killed himself on 26 August 1900.

Contemporary British and American observers levelled their greatest criticism at German, Russian, and Japanese troops for their ruthlessness and willingness to execute Chinese of all ages and backgrounds, sometimes burning and killing entire village populations. The German force arrived too late to take part in the fighting, but undertook punitive expeditions to villages in the countryside. Kaiser Wilhelm II on 27 July, during departure ceremonies for the German relief force, in a speech included an impromptu but intemperate reference to the Hun invaders of continental Europe, which would later be resurrected by British propaganda to mock Germany during the First World War and Second World War:

One newspaper called the aftermath of the siege a "carnival of ancient loot", and others called it "an orgy of looting" by soldiers, civilians and missionaries. These characterisations called to mind the sacking of the Summer Palace in 1860. Each nationality accused the others of being the worst looters. An American diplomat, Herbert G. Squiers, filled several railway carriages with loot and artefacts. The British Legation held loot auctions every afternoon and proclaimed, "Looting on the part of British troops was carried out in the most orderly manner." However, one British officer noted, "It is one of the unwritten laws of war that a city which does not surrender at the last and is taken by storm is looted." For the rest of 1900–1901, the British held loot auctions everyday except Sunday in front of the main-gate to the British Legation. Many foreigners, including Sir Claude Maxwell MacDonald and Lady Ethel MacDonald and George Ernest Morrison of The Times, were active bidders among the crowd. Many of these looted items ended up in Europe. The Catholic Beitang or North Cathedral was a "salesroom for stolen property."
The American commander General Adna Chaffee banned looting by American soldiers, but the ban was ineffectual.

Some but by no means all Western missionaries took an active part in calling for retribution. To provide restitution to missionaries and Chinese Christian families whose property had been destroyed, William Ament, a missionary of American Board of Commissioners for Foreign Missions, guided American troops through villages to punish those he suspected of being Boxers and confiscate their property. When Mark Twain read of this expedition, he wrote a scathing essay, "To the Person Sitting in Darkness", that attacked the "Reverend bandits of the American Board," especially targeting Ament, one of the most respected missionaries in China. The controversy was front-page news during much of 1901. Ament's counterpart on the distaff side was British missionary Georgina Smith, who presided over a neighbourhood in Beijing as judge and jury.

While one historical account reported that Japanese troops were astonished by other Alliance troops raping civilians, others noted that Japanese troops were 'looting and burning without mercy', and that Chinese 'women and girls by hundreds have committed suicide to escape a worse fate at the hands of Russian and Japanese brutes.' Roger Keyes, who commanded the British destroyer Fame and accompanied the Gaselee Expedition, noted that the Japanese had brought their own "regimental wives" (prostitutes) to the front to keep their soldiers from raping Chinese civilians.

The Daily Telegraph journalist E. J. Dillon stated that he witnessed the mutilated corpses of Chinese women who were raped and killed by the Alliance troops. The French commander dismissed the rapes, attributing them to "gallantry of the French soldier." A foreign journalist, George Lynch, said "there are things that I must not write, and that may not be printed in England, which would seem to show that this Western civilisation of ours is merely a veneer over savagery."

Many Manchu Bannermen supported the Boxers and shared their anti-foreign sentiment. Bannermen had been devastated in the First Sino-Japanese War in 1895 and Banner armies were destroyed while resisting the invasion. In the words of historian Pamela Crossley, their living conditions went "from desperate poverty to true misery." When thousands of Manchus fled south from Aigun during the fighting in 1900, their cattle and horses were stolen by Russian Cossacks who then burned their villages and homes to ashes. Manchu Banner armies were destroyed while resisting the invasion, many annihilated by Russians. Manchu Shoufu killed himself during the battle of Peking and the Manchu Lao She's father was killed by western soldiers in the battle as the Manchu banner armies of the Center Division of the Guards Army, Tiger Spirit Division and Peking Field Force in the Metropolitan banners were slaughtered by the western soldiers. The Inner city Legation Quarters and Catholic cathedral (Church of the Saviour, Beijing) were both attacked by Manchu bannermen. Manchu bannermen were slaughtered by the Eight Nation Alliance all over Manchuria and Beijing because most of the Manchu bannermen supported the Boxers.The clan system of the Manchus in Aigun was obliterated by the despoliation of the area at the hands of the Russian invaders. There were 1,266 households including 900 Daurs and 4,500 Manchus in Sixty-Four Villages East of the River and Blagoveshchensk until the Blagoveshchensk massacre and Sixty-Four Villages East of the River massacre committed by Russian Cossack soldiers. Many Manchu villages were burned by Cossacks in the massacre according to Victor Zatsepine.

Manchu royals, officials and officers like Yuxian, Qixiu 啟秀, Zaixun, Prince Zhuang and Captain Enhai (En Hai) were executed or forced to commit suicide by the Eight Nation Alliance. Manchu official Gangyi's 剛毅 execution was demanded, but he already died. Japanese soldiers arrested Qixiu before he was executed. Zaixun, Prince Zhuang was forced to commit suicide on 21 February 1901. They executed Yuxian on 22 February 1901. On 31 December 1900 German soldiers beheaded the Manchu captain Enhai for killing Clemens von Ketteler.

Reparations 

After the capture of Peking by the foreign armies, some of Empress Dowager Cixi's advisers advocated that the war be carried on, arguing that China could have defeated the foreigners as it was disloyal and traitorous people within China who allowed Beijing and Tianjin to be captured by the Allies, and that the interior of China was impenetrable. They also recommended that Dong Fuxiang continue fighting. The Empress Dowager Cixi was practical, however, and decided that the terms were generous enough for her to acquiesce when she was assured of her continued reign after the war and that China would not be forced to cede any territory.

On 7 September 1901, the Qing imperial court agreed to sign the "Boxer Protocol" also known as Peace Agreement between the Eight-Nation Alliance and China. The protocol ordered the execution of 10 high-ranking officials linked to the outbreak and other officials who were found guilty for the slaughter of foreigners in China. Alfons Mumm (Freiherr von Schwarzenstein), Ernest Satow and Komura Jutaro signed on behalf of Germany, Britain and Japan, respectively.

China was fined war reparations of 450,000,000 taels of fine silver (≈ @ 1.2 ozt/tael) for the loss that it caused. The reparation was to be paid by 1940, within 39 years, and would be 982,238,150 taels with interest (4 per cent per year) included. To help meet the payment it was agreed to increase the existing tariff from an actual 3.18 to 5 per cent, and to tax hitherto duty-free merchandise. The sum of reparation was estimated by the Chinese population (roughly 450 million in 1900), to let each Chinese pay one tael. Chinese custom income and salt taxes guaranteed the reparation. China paid 668,661,220 taels of silver from 1901 to 1939, equivalent in 2010 to ≈US$61 billion on a purchasing power parity basis.

A large portion of the reparations paid to the United States was diverted to pay for the education of Chinese students in U.S. universities under the Boxer Indemnity Scholarship Program. To prepare the students chosen for this program an institute was established to teach the English language and to serve as a preparatory school. When the first of these students returned to China they undertook the teaching of subsequent students; from this institute was born Tsinghua University. Some of the reparation due to Britain was later earmarked for a similar program.

The China Inland Mission lost more members than any other missionary agency:
58 adults and 21 children were killed. However, in 1901, when the allied nations were demanding compensation from the Chinese government, Hudson Taylor refused to accept payment for loss of property or life in order to demonstrate the meekness and gentleness of Christ to the Chinese.

The Belgian Catholic vicar apostolic of Ordos, Msgr. Alfons Bermyn wanted foreign troops garrisoned in Inner Mongolia, but the Governor refused. Bermyn petitioned the Manchu Enming to send troops to Hetao where Prince Duan's Mongol troops and General Dong Fuxiang's Muslim troops allegedly threatened Catholics. It turned out that Bermyn had created the incident as a hoax. Western Catholic missionaries forced Mongols to give up their land to Han Chinese Catholics as part of the Boxer indemnities according to Mongol historian Shirnut Sodbilig. Mongols had participated in attacks against Catholic missions in the Boxer rebellion.

The Qing government did not capitulate to all the foreign demands. The Manchu governor Yuxian, was executed, but the imperial court refused to execute the Han Chinese General Dong Fuxiang, although he had also encouraged the killing of foreigners during the rebellion. Empress Dowager Cixi intervened when the Alliance demanded him executed and Dong was only cashiered and sent back home. Instead, Dong lived a life of luxury and power in "exile" in his home province of Gansu. Upon Dong's death in 1908, all honours which had been stripped from him were restored and he was given a full military burial.

Long-term consequences 
The European great powers ceased their ambitions of colonising China since they had learned from the Boxer rebellions that the best way to deal with China was through the ruling dynasty, rather than directly with the Chinese people (a sentiment embodied in the adage: "The people are afraid of officials, the officials are afraid of foreigners, and the foreigners are afraid of the people"), and they even briefly assisted the Qing in their war against the Japanese to prevent Japanese domination in the region.

Concurrently, the period marks the decline of European great power interference in Chinese affairs, with the Japanese replacing the Europeans as the dominant power for their lopsided involvement in the war against the Boxers as well as their victory in the First Sino-Japanese War. With the toppling of the Qing that followed and the rise of the Nationalist Kuomintang, European sway in China was reduced to symbolic status. After replacing Russian influence in the southern half of Inner Manchuria as a result of the Russo-Japanese War, Japan came to dominate Asian affairs militarily and culturally with many of the Chinese scholars also educated in Japan, the most prominent example being Sun Yat-Sen, who would later found the Nationalist Kuomintang in China.

In October 1900, Russia occupied the provinces of Manchuria, a move that threatened Anglo-American hopes of maintaining the country's openness to commerce under the Open Door Policy.

Japan's clash with Russia over Liaodong and other provinces in eastern Manchuria, because of the Russian refusal to honour the terms of the Boxer protocol that called for their withdrawal, led to the Russo-Japanese War when two years of negotiations broke down in February 1904. The Russian Lease of the Liaodong (1898) was confirmed. Russia was ultimately defeated by an increasingly confident Japan.

Besides the compensation, Empress Dowager Cixi reluctantly started some reforms, despite her previous views. Known as the New Policies, which started in 1901, the imperial examination system for government service was eliminated, and the system of education through Chinese classics was replaced with a European liberal system that led to a university degree. Along with the formation of new military and police organisations, the reforms also simplified central bureaucracy and made a start at revamping taxation policies. After the deaths of Cixi and the Guangxu Emperor in 1908, the prince regent Zaifeng (Prince Chun), the Guangxu Emperor's brother, launched further reforms.

The effect on China was a weakening of the dynasty and its national defence capabilities. The government structure was temporarily sustained by the Europeans. Behind the international conflict, internal ideological differences between northern Chinese anti-foreign royalists and southern Chinese anti-Qing revolutionists were further deepened. The scenario in the last years of the Qing dynasty gradually escalated into a chaotic warlord era in which the most powerful northern warlords were hostile towards the southern revolutionaries, who overthrew the Qing monarchy in 1911. The rivalry was not fully resolved until the northern warlords were defeated by the Kuomintang's 1926–28 Northern Expedition. Prior to the final defeat of the Boxer Rebellion, all anti-Qing movements in the previous century, such as the Taiping Rebellion, had been successfully suppressed by the Qing.

The historian Walter LaFeber has argued that President William McKinley's decision to send 5,000 American troops to quell the rebellion marks "the origins of modern presidential war powers":

Arthur M. Schlesinger, Jr., concurred and wrote,

In the Second Sino-Japanese War, when the Japanese asked the Muslim general Ma Hongkui to defect and become head of a Muslim puppet state, he responded that his relatives had been killed during the Battle of Peking, including his uncle Ma Fulu. Since Japanese troops made up most of the Alliance forces, there would be no co-operation with the Japanese.

Controversies and changing views of the Boxers 

From the beginning, views differed as to whether the Boxers were better seen as anti-imperialist, patriotic and proto-nationalist, or as "uncivilized" irrational and futile opponents of inevitable change. The historian Joseph Esherick, comments that "confusion about the Boxer Uprising is not simply a matter of popular misconceptions" since "there is no major incident in China's modern history on which the range of professional interpretation is as great".

The Boxers drew condemnation from those who wanted to modernise China on Western models of civilisation. Sun Yat-sen, the founding father of the Republic of China and of the Kuomintang (Chinese Nationalist Party), at the time worked to overthrow the Qing but believed that government spread rumours that "caused confusion among the populace" and stirred up the Boxer Movement. He delivered "scathing criticism" of the Boxers' "anti-foreignism and obscurantism". Sun praised the Boxers for their "spirit of resistance" but called them "bandits". Students studying in Japan were ambivalent. Some stated that while the uprising originated from the ignorant and stubborn people, their beliefs were brave and righteous and could be transformed into a force for independence. After the fall of the Qing dynasty in 1911, nationalistic Chinese became more sympathetic to the Boxers. In 1918, Sun praised their fighting spirit and said that the Boxers were courageous and fearless in fighting to the death against the Alliance armies, specifically the Battle of Yangcun. Chinese liberals such as Hu Shih, who called on China to modernise, still condemned the Boxers for their irrationality and barbarity. The leader of the New Culture Movement, Chen Duxiu, forgave the "barbarism of the Boxer... given the crime foreigners committed in China" and contended that it was those "subservient to the foreigners" that truly "deserved our resentment."

In other countries, views of the Boxers were complex and contentious. Mark Twain said that "the Boxer is a patriot. He loves his country better than he does the countries of other people. I wish him success." The Russian writer Leo Tolstoy also praised the Boxers and accused Nicholas II of Russia and Wilhelm II of Germany of being chiefly responsible for the lootings, rapes, murders, and "Christian brutality" of the Russian and Western troops. The Russian revolutionary Vladimir Lenin mocked the Russian government's claim that it was protecting Christian civilisation: "Poor Imperial Government! So Christianly unselfish, and yet so unjustly maligned! Several years ago it unselfishly seized Port Arthur, and now it is unselfishly seizing Manchuria; it has unselfishly flooded the frontier provinces of China with hordes of contractors, engineers, and officers, who, by their conduct, have roused to indignation even the Chinese, known for their docility." The Russian newspaper Amurskii Krai criticised the killing of innocent civilians and charged that "restraint", "civilization" and "culture," instead of "racial hatred" and "destruction," would have been more becoming of a "civilized Christian nation." The paper asked, "What shall we tell civilized people? We shall have to say to them: 'Do not consider us as brothers anymore. We are mean and terrible people; we have killed those who hid at our place, who sought our protection.'"

Even some American churchmen spoke out in support of the Boxers. In 1912, the evangelist Rev. Dr. George F. Pentecost said that the Boxer uprising was a

The Indian Bengali Rabindranath Tagore attacked the European colonialists. A number of Indian soldiers in the British Indian Army sympathised with the cause of the Boxers, and in 1994 the Indian military returned a bell looted by British soldiers in the Temple of Heaven to China.

The events also left a longer impact. Historian Robert Bickers, noted that for the British government, the Boxer Rebellion served as the "equivalent of the Indian 'mutiny'", and the events of the rebellion influenced the idea of the Yellow Peril among the British public. Later events, he adds, such as the Chinese Nationalist Revolution in the 1920s and even the activities of the Red Guards of the 1960s were perceived as being in the shadow of the Boxers.

In Taiwan and Hong Kong, history textbooks often present the Boxer as irrational, but in Mainland China, the central government textbooks described the Boxer movement as an anti-imperialist, patriotic peasant movement that failed by the lack of leadership from the modern working class, and they described the international army as an invading force. In recent decades, however, large-scale projects of village interviews and explorations of archival sources have led historians in China to take a more nuanced view. Some non-Chinese scholars, such as Joseph Esherick, have seen the movement as anti-imperialist, but others hold that the concept "nationalistic" is anachronistic because the Chinese nation had not been formed, and the Boxers were more concerned with regional issues. Paul Cohen's recent study includes a survey of "the Boxers as myth," which shows how their memory was used in changing ways in 20th-century China from the New Culture Movement to the Cultural Revolution.

In recent years, the Boxer question has been debated in the People's Republic of China. In 1998, the critical scholar Wang Yi argued that the Boxers had features in common with the extremism of the Cultural Revolution. Both events had the external goal of "liquidating all harmful pests" and the domestic goal of "eliminating bad elements of all descriptions" and that the relation was rooted in "cultural obscurantism." Wang explained to his readers the changes in attitudes towards the Boxers from the condemnation of the May Fourth Movement to the approval expressed by Mao Zedong during the Cultural Revolution. In 2006, Yuan Weishi, a professor of philosophy at Zhongshan University in Guangzhou, wrote that the Boxers by their "criminal actions brought unspeakable suffering to the nation and its people! These are all facts that everybody knows, and it is a national shame that the Chinese people cannot forget." Yuan charged that history textbooks had been lacking in neutrality by presenting the Boxer Uprising as a "magnificent feat of patriotism" and not the view that most Boxer rebels were violent. In response, some labelled Yuan Weishi a "traitor" (Hanjian).

Terminology 
The name "Boxer Rebellion", concludes Joseph W. Esherick, a contemporary historian, is truly a "misnomer", for the Boxers "never rebelled against the Manchu rulers of China and their Qing dynasty" and the "most common Boxer slogan, throughout the history of the movement, was 'support the Qing, destroy the Foreign,' where 'foreign' clearly meant the foreign religion, Christianity, and its Chinese converts as much as the foreigners themselves." He adds that only after the movement was suppressed by the Allied Intervention did the foreign powers and influential Chinese officials both realise that the Qing would have to remain as the government of China in order to maintain order and collect taxes in order to pay the indemnity. Therefore, in order to save face for the Empress Dowager and the members of the imperial court, all argued that the Boxers were rebels and that the only support which the Boxers received from the imperial court came from a few Manchu princes. Esherick concludes that the origin of the term "rebellion" was "purely political and opportunistic", but it has had a remarkable staying power, particularly in popular accounts.

On 6 June 1900, The Times of London used the term "rebellion" in quotation marks, presumably to indicate its view that the rising was actually instigated by Empress Dowager Cixi. The historian Lanxin Xiang refers to the uprising as the "so called 'Boxer Rebellion,'" and he also states that "while peasant rebellion was nothing new in Chinese history, a war against the world's most powerful states was." Other recent Western works refer to the uprising as the "Boxer Movement", the "Boxer War" or the Yihetuan Movement, while Chinese studies refer to it as the 义和团运动 (Yihetuan yundong), that is, the "Yihetuan Movement." In his discussion of the general and legal implications of the terminology involved, the German scholar Thoralf Klein notes that all of the terms, including the Chinese terms, are "posthumous interpretations of the conflict." He argues that each term, whether it be "uprising", "rebellion" or "movement" implies a different definition of the conflict. Even the term "Boxer War", which has frequently been used by scholars in the West, raises questions. Neither side made a formal declaration of war. The imperial edicts on June 21 said that hostilities had begun and directed the regular Chinese army to join the Boxers against the Allied armies. This was a de facto declaration of war. The Allied troops behaved like soldiers who were mounting a punitive expedition in colonial style, rather than soldiers who were waging a declared war with legal constraints. The Allies took advantage of the fact that China had not signed "The Laws and Customs of War on Land", a key document signed at the 1899 Hague Peace Conference. They argued that China had violated provisions that they themselves ignored. 

There is also a difference in terms referring to the combatants. The first reports which came from China in 1898 referred to the village activists as the "Yihequan", (Wade–Giles: I Ho Ch'uan). The earliest use of the term "Boxer" is contained in a letter which was written in Shandong in September 1899 by missionary Grace Newton. The context of the letter makes it clear that when it was written, "Boxer" was already a well-known term, probably coined by Arthur H. Smith or Henry Porter, two missionaries who were also residing in Shandong. Smith says in his 1902 book that the name

Later representations 

By 1900, many new forms of media had matured, including illustrated newspapers and magazines, postcards, broadsides, and advertisements, all of which presented images of the Boxers and the invading armies. The rebellion was covered in the foreign illustrated press by artists and photographers. Paintings and prints were also published including Japanese woodblocks. In the following decades, the Boxers were a constant subject of comment. A sampling includes:

 In the Polish play The Wedding by Stanisław Wyspiański, first published on 16 March 1901, even before the rebellion was finally crushed, the character of Czepiec asks the Journalist (Dziennikarz) one of the best-known questions in the history of Polish literature: "Cóż tam, panie, w polityce? Chińczyki trzymają się mocno!? ("How are things in politics, Mister? Are the Chinese holding out firmly!?").
 Liu E, The Travels of Lao Can sympathetically shows an honest official trying to carry out reforms and depicts the Boxers as sectarian rebels.
 G. A. Henty, With the Allies to Pekin, a Tale of the Relief of the Legations (New York: Scribners, 1903; London: Blackie, 1904). Juvenile fiction by a widely read author depicts the Boxers as "a mob of ruffians."
 A false or forged diary, Diary of his Excellency Ching-Shan: Being a Chinese Account of the Boxer Troubles, including text written by Edmund Backhouse, who claimed he recovered the document from a burnt building. It is suspected that Backhouse falsified the document, as well as other stories because he was prone to tell tales dubious in nature, including claims of nightly visits to the Empress Dowager Cixi.
 In Hergé's The Adventures of Tintin comic The Blue Lotus, Tintin's Chinese friend Chang Chong-Chen when they first meet, after Tintin saves the boy from drowning, the boy asks Tintin why he saved him from drowning as, according to Chang's uncle who fought in the Rebellion, all white people were wicked.
 The novel Moment in Peking (1939), by Lin Yutang, opens during the Boxer Rebellion, and provides a child's-eye view of the turmoil through the eyes of the protagonist.
 Tulku, a 1979 children's novel by Peter Dickinson, includes the effects of the Boxer Rebellion on a remote part of China.
 The Diamond Age or, A Young Lady's Illustrated Primer (New York, 1996), by Neal Stephenson, includes a quasi-historical re-telling of the Boxer Rebellion as an integral component of the novel
 The novel The Palace of Heavenly Pleasure (2003), by Adam Williams, describes the experiences of a small group of foreign missionaries, traders, and railway engineers in a fictional town in northern China shortly before and during the Boxer Rebellion.
 Illusionist William Ellsworth Robinson (a.k.a. Chung Ling Soo) had a bullet-catch trick entitled "Condemned to Death by the Boxers", which famously resulted in his onstage death.
 The 1963 film 55 Days at Peking directed by Nicholas Ray and starring Charlton Heston, Ava Gardner and David Niven.
 In 1975 Hong Kong's Shaw Brothers studio produced the film Boxer Rebellion under director Chang Cheh with one of the highest budgets to tell a sweeping story of disillusionment and revenge.
 Hong Kong's Shaw Brothers Legendary Weapons of China (1981), director Lau Kar Leung. A comedy starring Hsiao Ho (Hsiao Hou) as a disillusioned boxer of the Magic Clan who is sent to assassinate the former leader of a powerful boxer clan who refuses to dupe his students into believing they are impervious to firearms.
 There are several flashbacks to the Boxer Rebellion in the television shows Buffy the Vampire Slayer and Angel. During the conflict, Spike kills his first slayer to impress Drusilla, and Angel decisively splits from Darla.
 The film Shanghai Knights (2003), starring Jackie Chan and Owen Wilson, takes place in 1887 and features Boxers as the henchmen of the film's lead antagonist, English Lord Rathbone (Aiden Gillen), either working as mercenaries for Rathbone, or helping him as part of their support for the anti-imperialist leader Wu Chow (Donnie Yen), Rathbone's ally.
 The Last Empress (Boston, 2007), by Anchee Min, describes the long reign of the Empress Dowager Cixi in which the siege of the legations is one of the climactic events in the novel.
 Mo, Yan. Sandalwood Death. The viewpoint of villagers during Boxer Uprising.
 The pair of graphic novels by Gene Luen Yang, with color by Lark Pien, Boxers and Saints, describes the "bands of foreign missionaries and soldiers" who "roam the countryside bullying and robbing Chinese peasants." In Boxers, Little Bao, "harnessing the powers of ancient Chinese gods", recruits an army of Boxers, "commoners trained in kung fu who fight to free China from 'foreign devils.'" In Saints, Four-Sister a.k.a. Vibiana learns of the Christian faith, but was killed by Bao.
 The 2013 video game BioShock Infinite featured the Boxer Rebellion as a major historical moment for the floating city of Columbia. Columbia, to rescue American hostages during the rebellion, opened fire upon the city of Peking and burned it to the ground. These actions resulted in the United States recalling Columbia, which led to its secession from the Union.
 The Boxer Rebellion is the historical backdrop for the episode titled "Kung Fu Crabtree" (Season 7, Episode 16, aired 24 March 2014) of the television series Murdoch Mysteries, in which Chinese officials visit Toronto in 1900 in search of Boxers who have fled from China.

See also 

 Battle of Peking (1900)
 Boxer Indemnity Scholarship Program
 Century of humiliation
 China Relief Expedition
 Donghak Rebellion, an anti-foreign, proto-nationalist uprising in pre-Japanese Korea
 Gengzi Guobian Tanci
 Imperial Decree on events leading to the signing of Boxer Protocol
 List of 1900–1930 publications on the Boxer Rebellion
 Xishiku Cathedral

References

Citations

Sources 

 
 
  David D. Buck, "Review", The China Quarterly 173 (2003): 234–237. calls this a strong "revisionist" account.
 
  Excerpt
 
 
 
 ; British title: Besieged in Peking: The Story of the 1900 Boxer Rising (London: Constable, 1999); popular history.

Further reading

General accounts and analysis 
In addition to those used in the notes and listed under References, general accounts can be found in such textbooks as Jonathan Spence, In Search of Modern China, pp.230–235; Keith Schoppa, Revolution and Its Past, pp. 118–123; and Immanuel Hsu, Ch 16, "The Boxer Uprising", in The Rise of Modern China (1990).
 Bickers, Robert A., and R. G. Tiedemann, eds., The Boxers, China, and the World. Lanham: Rowman & Littlefield, 2007. .
 Bickers, Robert A. The Scramble for China: Foreign Devils in the Qing Empire, 1800–1914 (London: Allen Lane, 2011). online review
 Buck, David D. "Recent Studies of the Boxer Movement", Chinese Studies in History 20 (1987). Introduction to a special issue of the journal devoted to translations of recent research on the Boxers in the People's Republic.
 Der Ling, Princess (1928). Old Buddha, Dodd, Mead & Company. Chapters XXXII-XXXVIII.
 Harrison, Henrietta. "Justice on Behalf of Heaven" History Today (Sep 2000), Vol. 50 Issue 9, pp 44–51 online; popular history.
 Knüsel, Ariane. "Facing the Dragon: Teaching the Boxer Uprising Through Cartoons." History Teacher 50.2 (2017): 201–226. online
 Shan, Patrick Fuliang (2018). Yuan Shikai: A Reappraisal, The University of British Columbia Press. .
 Purcell, Victor (1963). The Boxer Uprising: A background study. online edition
  
 Wu, Jiarui. "Ramifications of Two Divergent Paths: A Comparative Study of 1900 and 2020 Crises in China." Advances in Historical Studies 11.1 (2022): 1–14. online

Missionary experience and personal accounts 
 Bell, P, and Clements, R, (2014). Lives from a Black Tin Box  The story of the Xinzhou martyrs, Shanxi Province.
 Brandt, Nat (1994). Massacre in Shansi. Syracuse University Press. . The story of the Oberlin missionaries at Taigu, Shanxi.
 Clark, Anthony E. (2015). Heaven in Conflict: Franciscans and the Boxer Uprising in Shanxi. Seattle and London: University of Washington Press. 
 Hsia, R. Po-chia. "Christianity and Empire: The Catholic Mission in Late Imperial China." Studies in Church History 54 (2018): 208–224.
 Price, Eva Jane. China Journal, 1889–1900: An American Missionary Family During the Boxer Rebellion, (1989). . Review: Susanna Ashton, "Compound Walls: Eva Jane Price's Letters from a Chinese Mission, 1890–1900." Frontiers 1996 17(3): 80–94. . The journal of the events leading up to the deaths of the Price family.
 Sharf, Frederic A., and Peter Harrington (2000). China 1900: The Eyewitnesses Speak. London: Greenhill. . Excerpts from German, British, Japanese, and American soldiers, diplomats and journalists.
 Sharf, Frederic A., and Peter Harrington (2000). China 1900: The Artists' Perspective. London: Greenhill. 
 Tiedemann, R.G. "Boxers, Christians and the culture of violence in north China" Journal of Peasant Studies (1998) 25:4 pp 150–160, DOI: 10.1080/03066159808438688
 Tiedemann, R.G. Reference Guide to Christian Missionary Societies in China: From the Sixteenth to the Twentieth Century (East Gate Books, 2009)

Allied intervention, the Boxer War, and the aftermath 
 Bodin, Lynn E. and Christopher Warner. The Boxer Rebellion. London: Osprey, Men-at-Arms Series 95, 1979.  (pbk.) Illustrated history of the military campaign.
 
 Hevia, James L. "Leaving a Brand on China: Missionary Discourse in the Wake of the Boxer Movement", Modern China 18.3 (1992): 304–332.
 Hevia, James L. "A Reign of Terror: Punishment and Retribution in Beijing and its Environs", Chapter 6, in English Lessons: The Pedagogy of Imperialism in Nineteenth Century China (Durham, NC: Duke University Press, 2003), pp. 195–240. 
 Hunt, Michael H. "The American Remission of the Boxer Indemnity: A Reappraisal", Journal of Asian Studies 31 (Spring 1972): 539–559.
 Hunt, Michael H. "The Forgotten Occupation: Peking, 1900–1901", Pacific Historical Review 48.4 (November 1979): 501–529.
 Langer, William. The Diplomacy of Imperialism 1890–1902 (2nd ed. 1950), pp. 677–709.

Contemporary accounts and sources 
. A contemporary account.
 
 E. H. Edwards, Fire and Sword in Shansi: The Story of the Martyrdom of Foreigners and Chinese Christians (New York: Revell, 1903)
 Isaac Taylor Headland, Chinese Heroes; Being a Record of Persecutions Endured by Native Christians in the Boxer Uprising (New York, Cincinnati: Eaton & Mains; Jennings & Pye, 1902).
 Arnold Henry Savage Landor, China and the Allies (New York: Scribner's, 1901). 01008198 Google Books: China and the Allies
 Pierre Loti, The Last Days of Pekin (Boston: Little, Brown and Co., 1902): tr. of Les Derniers Jours De Pékin (Paris: Lévy, 1900).
 W. A. P. Martin, The Siege in Peking, China against the World (New York: F. H. Revell company, 1900).
 Putnam Weale, Bertram Lenox, (1907). Indiscreet Letters from Peking: Being the Notes of an Eyewitness, Which Set Forth in Some Detail, From Day to Day, The Real Story of the Siege and Sack of a Distressed Capital in 1900– The Year of Great Tribulation. Dodd, Mead. Free ebook. Project Gutenberg.
 Arthur H. Smith, China in Convulsion (New York: F. H. Revell, 2 vols. 1901). Internet Archive  Volume I Volume II, An account of the Boxers and the siege by a missionary who had lived in a North China village.
Giuseppe Salvago Raggi The Only Man Dressing for Dinner. Beijing 1900 (Verona: Gingko,2019). An account of the Italian Minister in Peking.

External links 

 Lost in the Gobi Desert: Hart retraces great-grandfather's footsteps, William & Mary News Story, 3 January 2005.
 September 1900 San Francisco Newspaper
 200 Photographs in Library of Congress online Collection
 
 
 University of Washington Library's Digital Collections – Robert Henry Chandless Photographs
 Proceedings of the Tenth Universal Peace Congress, 1901
 Pictures from the Siege of Peking, from the Caldwell Kvaran archives
 Eyewitness account: When the Allies Entered Peking, 1900, an excerpt of Pierre Loti's Les Derniers Jours de Pékin (1902).
 Documents of the Boxer Rebellion (China Relief Expedition), 1900–1901 National Museum of the U.S. Navy (Selected Naval Documents).
 Internet Archive "Boxer Rebellion" Books, films, and audio

 
Wars involving the United States
1899 in China
1899 in Christianity
1900 in China
1900 in Christianity
1901 in China
1901 in Christianity
Anti-Christian sentiment in Asia
Anti-imperialism in Asia
Attacks on diplomatic missions in China
Battles involving the princely states of India
Chinese nationalism
Chinese Taoists
Conflicts involving the German Empire
Eight Banners
History of the Royal Marines
Looting
Persecution of Christians
Rebellions in the Qing dynasty
Shamanism
United States Marine Corps in the 18th and 19th centuries
United States Marine Corps in the 20th century
Wars involving France
Wars involving Germany
Wars involving Italy
Wars involving Japan
Wars involving the Habsburg monarchy
Wars involving the Russian Empire
Wars involving the United Kingdom